Cow Branch is a stream in Atchison County in the U.S. state of Missouri.

According to tradition, Cow Branch was so named on account of farmers letting their cows graze the area.

See also
List of rivers of Missouri

References

Rivers of Atchison County, Missouri
Rivers of Missouri